Liberty Centre, also known as One Liberty Centre, is a skyscraper located at 633 Northeast Liberty Place in Portland, Oregon's Lloyd District, in the United States.

Knowledge Universe occupied space in the building, as of mid 2014.

References

External links
 

Lloyd District, Portland, Oregon
Northeast Portland, Oregon
Skyscrapers in Portland, Oregon